Pacal is a genus of hubbardiid short-tailed whipscorpions, first described by Reddell & Cokendolpher in 1995.

Species 
, the World Schizomida Catalog accepts the following three species:

 Pacal lacandonus (Rowland, 1975) – Mexico
 Pacal stewarti (Rowland, 1973) – Mexico
 Pacal trilobatus (Rowland, 1975) – Mexico

References 

Schizomida genera